HMS Plym (K271) was a River-class frigate that served in the Royal Navy between 1943 and 1952. The ship was destroyed in the United Kingdom's first nuclear weapon test, Operation Hurricane in 1952.

Construction
Plym was built to the Royal Navy's specifications as a Group II . She was laid down by Smiths Dock Co. at their yard in South Bank-on-Tees on 1 August 1942 and launched on 4 February 1943. She was commissioned into the Royal Navy on 16 May 1943 as HMS Plym (K271) and was named after the River Plym in Devon, England which flows into the English Channel at Plymouth.

Service history
Plym saw extensive service on Atlantic convoy escort missions.

Operation Hurricane
Plym was used as the detonation platform for the UK's first nuclear weapon in Operation Hurricane.

Although data acquisition would have been simplified by detonating the bomb from a tower above the ground or sea surface, it was conducted aboard Plym in order to simulate the effects of a nuclear weapon being smuggled into a British harbour aboard a ship.

References
 

1943 ships
River-class frigates of the Royal Navy